The Ernst Thälmann Island ( or ;  or ) is a  long and  island in the Gulf of Cazones that is named after Ernst Thälmann, a German communist politician. During a 1970s state visit to the German Democratic Republic (GDR) (East Germany), Fidel Castro made a promise that Cuba would donate an island to the East German government, and Cayo Blanco del Sur was renamed in a ceremony during a state visit by Erich Honecker. But after the reunification of Germany, when a German newspaper tried to visit the island, they were told this transfer had only been "symbolic".

History

1970s

During a state visit in June 1972 by Erich Honecker, Fidel Castro renamed the island in honour of German communist politician and activist Ernst Thälmann. East Germany's state television newscast, reported on the ceremony and the unveiling of the bust of Thälmann on 18 August 1972 in the presence of the GDR ambassador, some East German delegates, and approximately 100 Cuban representatives.

In March 1975, the East German government sent singer Frank Schöbel to Cuba to make music videos. Some footage of the island was also shot, which was later included in a documentary emphasizing the island as a symbol of GDR–Cuban friendship.

Recent history
In 1998, the island was severely hit by Hurricane Mitch, knocking over the bust of Thälmann.

According to both the Cuban embassy in Germany and the German Foreign Office, the renaming was a "symbolic act", and the island was never transferred from Cuba. Neither of the German states owned the island during or after the reunification.

See also
 Canarreos Archipelago, near the island
 Republic of Molossia, a micronation claiming to be at war with the island

References

External links
 Spiegel Online: "Ernst-Thälmann-Insel – DDR unter Palmen" 

Islands of Cuba
Geography of Matanzas Province
1972 in politics
1972 in international relations
Cuba–East Germany relations
Uninhabited islands